Lena Glaz (born 23 May 1961) is an Israeli chess player who holds the title of Woman International Master (WIM, 1985). She won the Israeli Women's Chess Championship in 1980.

Biography
In 1977, Lena Glaz won Azerbaijani Women's Chess Championship. In 1978, she won Soviet  sports society Dynamo Women's Chess Championship. In 1979, she moved to Israel. In 1980, Lena Glaz won Israeli Women's Chess Championship. In 1987, Lena Glaz participated in the Women's World Chess Championship Interzonal Tournament in Zheleznovodsk where shared 10th-11th place with Giovanna Arbunic Castro.

Lena Glaz played for Israel in the Women's Chess Olympiads:
 In 1980, at first board in the 9th Chess Olympiad (women) in Valletta (+3, =5, -5),
 In 1982, at first board in the 10th Chess Olympiad (women) in Lucerne (+10, =0, -4),
 In 1988, at second board in the 28th Chess Olympiad (women) in Thessaloniki (+4, =1, -3),
 In 2014, at reserve board in the 41st Chess Olympiad (women) in Tromsø (+2, =1, -1).

In 1985, she was awarded the FIDE Woman International Master (WIM) title. Also she is FIDE Arbiter (2015) and FIDE Trainer (2016).

Lena Glaz graduated from Hebrew University of Jerusalem and Jerusalem Academy of Music and Dance. She works as a headmaster and child trainer of Beersheba Chess School.

References

External links
 
 
 

1961 births
Living people
Sportspeople from Baku
Azerbaijani female chess players
Israeli female chess players
Soviet female chess players
Chess Woman International Masters
Chess Olympiad competitors
Hebrew University of Jerusalem alumni
Azerbaijani Jews
Soviet emigrants to Israel